Abergairn Castle is a ruined castle, dating from the 17th century, about one mile north of Ballater, Aberdeenshire, Scotland.  It is built on the top of an isolated kame, at the north-east of the entrance to Glen Gairn.

History
The castle was the property of the Farquharsons.  It was built in 1614, possibly as a hunting lodge.  The name is of Gaelic derivation, meaning "the confluence of the Gairn", indicating its location near the confluence of River Gairn and River Dee.

Structure
Abergairn castle was a tower house of which little other than the basement remains.  It was small, probably having three or four storeys with a garret.

The main tower survives only to a maximum height of 4 feet; a round tower to the north-west reaches to 10 feet.

References

Castles in Aberdeenshire